Maiden Holdings Ltd. is a Bermuda based holding company with insurance subsidiaries that provides specialty reinsurance products for the global property and casualty market. The company has operating subsidiaries in the United States (Maiden Re, Maiden Specialty), Europe (Maiden International), and Bermuda (Maiden Insurance).

Milestones 
2007 - Maiden Holdings, Ltd. formed in Bermuda.
2008 - Maiden Holdings acquires GMAC RE and rebrands the operation as Maiden Re.
2010 - Maiden Holdings acquires GMAC International Insurance Services, Ltd.’s reinsurance business.

References

External links 

Insurance companies of Bermuda
Reinsurance companies